Cleopas Sipho Dlamini (born 26 December 1952) is  a Liswati business executive who serves as the prime minister of Eswatini, holding the office from 16 July 2021.

He replaced Themba N. Masuku, who occupied the office in acting capacity, following the death in December 2020, of the previous substantive office holder Ambrose Mandvulo Dlamini. Before he was named prime minister, Cleopas was the chief executive officer of the Public Pension Fund of the Kingdom of Eswatini. He was also a Senator in the Eswatini Senate.

Prime Minister of Eswatini
The new prime minister took the oath of office on 19 July 2021 and also swore in as a member of the Parliament of Eswatini. He chaired his first cabinet meeting on the morning of 20 July 2021.

See also
 List of prime ministers of Eswatini

References

External links 
 Eswatini king appoints new prime minister As of 16 July 2021.

Living people
Place of birth missing (living people)
Prime Ministers of Eswatini
Swazi businesspeople
Swazi chief executives
University of Eswatini alumni
1952 births